Events from the year 1957 in the United States.

Incumbents

Federal Government 
 President: Dwight D. Eisenhower (R-Kansas/New York then Kansas/Pennsylvania)
 Vice President: Richard Nixon (R-California)
 Chief Justice: Earl Warren (California)
 Speaker of the House of Representatives: Sam Rayburn (D–Texas)
 Senate Majority Leader: Lyndon B. Johnson (D-Texas)
 Congress: 84th (until January 3), 85th (starting January 3)

Events

January

 January 2 – The San Francisco and Los Angeles stock exchanges merge to form the Pacific Coast Stock Exchange.
 January 6 – Elvis Presley appears on The Ed Sullivan Show for the third and final time. He is only shown from the waist up, even during the gospel segment, singing "Peace In The Valley". Ed Sullivan describes Elvis thus: "This is a real decent, fine boy. We've never had a pleasanter experience on our show with a big name than we've had with you. You're thoroughly alright."
 January 20 – Dwight D. Eisenhower and Richard Nixon are inaugurated for a second term as President of the United States and Vice President of the United States respectively.
 January 22 – The New York City "Mad Bomber", George Metesky, is arrested in Waterbury, Connecticut, and charged with planting more than 30 bombs.
 January 23 – Ku Klux Klan members force truck driver Willie Edwards to jump off a bridge into the Alabama River; he drowns as a result.
 January 31 – Pacoima aircraft accident: Three students on a junior high school playground in Pacoima, California, are among the 8 persons killed following a mid-air collision between a Douglas DC-7 airliner and a Northrop F-89 Scorpion fighter jet, in the skies above the San Fernando Valley section of Los Angeles.

February
 February 4 – The first nuclear-powered submarine, logs its 60,000th nautical mile, matching the endurance of the fictional Nautilus described in Jules Verne's novel Twenty Thousand Leagues Under the Sea.
 February 17 – The Warrenton Nursing Home fire in Missouri kills 72 people.
 February 25 – The "Boy In The Box" is discovered along a sidewalk in Philadelphia. The murder victim is described as Caucasian in appearance and 4 to 6 years old; the boy was identified as Joseph Augustus Zarelli in 2022.

March

 March 4 – Standard & Poor's first publishes the S&P 500 Index in the United States.
 March 7 – The United States Congress approves the Eisenhower Doctrine on assistance to Communist-threatened foreign regimes.
 March 10 – Floodgates of The Dalles Dam are closed, inundating Celilo Falls and ancient Native American fisheries along the Columbia River in Oregon.
 March 13 – The U.S. Federal Bureau of Investigation arrests Jimmy Hoffa and charges him with bribery.
 March 22 – The 5.7  San Francisco earthquake shook the Bay Area in California with a maximum Mercalli intensity of VII (Very strong), causing $1 million in losses, one death and forty injuries.
 March 25 – Copies of Allen Ginsberg's Howl and Other Poems (first published November 1, 1956), printed in the UK, are seized by United States Customs Service officials in San Francisco, on the grounds of obscenity. On October 3, in People v. Ferlinghetti, a subsequent prosecution of publisher Lawrence Ferlinghetti, the work is ruled not to be obscene.
 March 26 – 22-year-old Elvis Presley buys Graceland on 3734 Bellevue Boulevard (Highway 51 South) for $100,000. He and his family move from the house on 1034 Audubon Drive.
 March 27 – The 29th Academy Awards ceremony, hosted by Jerry Lewis and Celeste Holm, is held at RKO Pantages Theatre in Hollywood. The ceremony started a trend toward blockbusters and colorful spectaculars, with Michael Anderson's Around the World in 80 Days winning Best Motion Picture chief among them. The film is tied with Walter Lang's The King and I for the most awards with five, while George Stevens' Giant receives the most nominations with ten, including Stevens' second Best Director win.
 March 31 – Rodgers and Hammerstein's Cinderella, the team's only musical written especially for television, is telecast live and in color by CBS, starring Julie Andrews in the title role. The production is seen by millions, but this 1957 version is not telecast again for more than 40 years, when a kinescope of it is shown.

April
 April 12 – Allen Ginsberg's poem Howl, printed in the United Kingdom, is seized by U.S. customs officials on the grounds of obscenity.

May
 May 2 
Iron Liege, at 8–1, wins the Kentucky Derby in one of the most eventful Derbys ever.
 Vincent Gigante fails to assassinate mafioso Frank Costello in Manhattan.
 May 3 – Brooklyn Dodgers owner Walter O'Malley agrees to move the team from Brooklyn, to Los Angeles.
 May 16 – Walt Whitman Bridge opens between Philadelphia and New Jersey.

June
 June 1 – Three-year-old thoroughbred Gallant Man wins the Peter Pan Stakes, at Belmont Park.
 June 15 – Oklahoma celebrates its semi-centennial statehood. A brand new 1957 Plymouth Belvedere is buried in a time capsule (to be opened 50 years later on June 15, 2007).
 June 20 – 1957 Fargo Tornado starts at 7:30 pm. 
 June 23 – Royal Ice Cream sit-in
 June 25 – The United Church of Christ is formed in Cleveland, Ohio, by the merger of the Congregational Christian Churches and the Evangelical and Reformed Church.
 June 27 – Hurricane Audrey demolishes Cameron, Louisiana, killing 400 people.

July
 July 9 – Elvis Presley's Loving You opens in movie theaters.
 July 16 – United States Marine Major John Glenn flies an F8U supersonic jet from California to New York in 3 hours, 23 minutes and 8 seconds, setting a new transcontinental speed record.

August
 August 5 – American Bandstand, a local dance show produced by WFIL-TV in Philadelphia, joins the ABC Television Network.
 August 21 – U.S. President Dwight D. Eisenhower announces a 2-year suspension of nuclear testing.
 August 28 – United States Senator Strom Thurmond (D-SC) sets the record for the longest filibuster with his 24-hour, 18-minute speech railing against a civil rights bill.

September
 September 4 
American Civil Rights Movement – Governor Orville Faubus of Arkansas calls out the National Guard of the United States to prevent the "Little Rock Nine" African American students from enrolling in Little Rock Central High School.
The Ford Motor Company introduces the Edsel on what the company proclaims as "E Day".
 September 5 – Viking Press publishes On the Road by Jack Kerouac.
 September 9
 Civil Rights Act of 1957 enacted, setting up the United States Commission on Civil Rights.
 Catholic Memorial High School opens its doors for the first time in Boston, Massachusetts.
 September 23 – The Academy Award-winning movie The Three Faces of Eve is released.
 September 24 – U.S. President Dwight D. Eisenhower sends federal troops to Arkansas to provide safe passage into Little Rock Central High School for the Little Rock Nine.
 September 26 – West Side Story, a new musical by Leonard Bernstein, Jerome Robbins, Arthur Laurents and Stephen Sondheim opens at the Winter Garden Theatre on Broadway.

October
 October 4 – The sitcom Leave It to Beaver premieres on CBS.
 October 9 – Neil H. McElroy is sworn in as United States Secretary of Defense.
 October 10
 U.S. President Dwight D. Eisenhower apologizes to the finance minister of Ghana, Komla Agbeli Gbdemah, after he is refused service in a restaurant in Dover, Delaware.
 Ayn Rand's novel Atlas Shrugged is published.
 The Milwaukee Braves defeat the New York Yankees, 4 games to 3, to win their 2nd World Series Title.
 October 11 – The orbit of the last stage of the R-7 Semyorka rocket (carrying Sputnik I) is first successfully calculated on an IBM 704 computer during Operation Moonwatch, Cambridge, Massachusetts.
 October 21 – The U.S. military sustains its first combat fatality in Vietnam, Army Capt. Hank Cramer of the 1st Special Forces Group.
 October 25 – Mafia boss Albert Anastasia is assassinated in a barber shop, at the Park Sheraton Hotel in New York City.
 October 31 – Toyota begins exporting vehicles to the U.S., beginning with the Toyota Crown and the Toyota Land Cruiser

November
 November 1 
 The Mackinac Bridge, the world's longest suspension bridge between anchorages at the time, opens to traffic connecting Michigan's two peninsulas.
 The first (westbound) tube of the Hampton Roads Bridge–Tunnel, linking Norfolk and Hampton, Virginia, opens at a cost of $44 million.
 November 6 – Jailhouse Rock opens nationally and Elvis Presley continues to gain more notoriety.
 November 7 – Cold War: In the United States, the Gaither Report calls for more American missiles and fallout shelters.
 November 8 – The film Jailhouse Rock opens across the U.S. to reach #3, and Elvis Presley continues to gain more notoriety.
 November 14 – Apalachin Meeting: American Mafia leaders meet in Apalachin, New York, at the house of Joseph Barbara; the meeting is broken up by a curious patrolman.
 November 16 
 Edward Gein murders his last victim, Bernice Worden of Plainfield, Wisconsin.
 Oklahoma celebrates its 50th anniversary of statehood.
 Notre Dame beats the Oklahoma Sooners 7–0 to end the longest winning streak in college football history at 47.
 November 25 – U.S. President Dwight D. Eisenhower suffers a stroke.

December

 December 2 – Shippingport Atomic Power Station goes onstream; commercial operation begins on May 26, 1958.
 December 6 – Vanguard TV3, the first U.S. attempt to launch a satellite, fails with the rocket blowing up on the launch pad.
 December 18 – The Bridge on the River Kwai is released in the U.S. It goes on to win the Academy Award for Best Picture. Additional Oscars go to Alec Guinness (eh Actor) and David Lean (eh Director), among others. This is Lean's first Oscar for directing.
 December 19 – Meredith Willson's classic musical The Music Man, starring Robert Preston, is premièred on Broadway.
 December 20 – The Boeing 707 airliner flies for the first time.
 December 22 – The CBS afternoon anthology series The Seven Lively Arts presents Tchaikovsky's ballet The Nutcracker on U.S. television for the first time.

Undated
 Operation Dropshot, an all-out U.S. war with the Soviet Union, is expected to be triggered by the Soviet takeover of Western Europe, the Near East and parts of Eastern Asia, as it was anticipated in 1949.

Ongoing
 Cold War (1947–1991)

Births

January

 January 1
 Mark Hurd, American businessman (d. 2019)
 Karen Pence, American educator, and teacher, 48th Second Lady of the United States
 January 4 – Patty Loveless, American country music singer
 January 6
 Freddie Glenn, American spree killer and rapist, convicted of murdering the younger sister of actor Kelsey Grammer
 Nancy Lopez, American golfer
 January 7
 Nicholson Baker, American novelist
 Katie Couric, American television host
 Steve Janaszak, American professional ice hockey player
 January 8
 Dwight Clark, American football player (d. 2018)
 David Lang, American composer
 January 12 – John Lasseter, American director, writer and animator
 January 13
 Ralph DeLoach, American football player (d. 2022)
 Claudia Emerson, American poet, Pulitzer Prize winner in 2006 (d. 2014)
 Lorrie Moore, American writer
 January 15
 Turk Schonert, American football player (d. 2019)
 Mario Van Peebles, African-American actor and director
 January 17 – Steve Harvey, African-American comedian, television host, radio personality and actor
 January 21 – Greg Ryan, American soccer coach
 January 26 – Road Warrior Hawk, American professional wrestler (d. 2003)
 January 27 – Frank Miller, American comic book writer
 January 30 – Payne Stewart, American golfer (d. 1999)

February

 February 6
 Kathy Najimy, actress and comedian
 Robert Townsend, African-American actor, comedian, director and writer (Hollywood Shuffle)
 February 7 – Carney Lansford, baseball player and coach 
 February 8
 Robert S. Kapito, business investor
 Cindy Wilson, rock singer (The B-52's)
 February 15 
 Nathaniel Bar-Jonah, criminal (d. 2008)
 Jake E. Lee, guitarist and songwriter 
 Jimmy Spencer, race car driver and sportscaster
 February 16 – LeVar Burton, African-American actor
 February 18 – Vanna White, American game show presenter (Wheel of Fortune)
 February 20 - Dean Zelinsky, American guitar designer, maker and luthier. Founder of (Dean Guitars) and (Dean Zelinsky Guitars)
 February 26
 David Beasley, lawyer and politician, 113th Governor of South Carolina
 Joe Mullen, ice hockey player and coach
 Keena Rothhammer, swimmer
 February 27 – Ralph Cox, ice hockey player
 February 28 – John Turturro, actor, writer and director

March

 March 4
 Jim Dwyer, American journalist, Pulitzer Prize winner
 Rick Mast, American NASCAR driver
 Mykelti Williamson, African-American actor
 March 6 – Eddie Deezen, American voice actor, comedian
 March 12
 Val Demings, African-American politician
 Marlon Jackson, African-American singer
 March 13 – David Peaston, American singer (d. 2012)
 March 15 – Park Overall, American film and television actress
 March 20
 Vanessa Bell Calloway, African-American actress
 John Grogan, American journalist
 Spike Lee, African-American film director and actor
 Theresa Russell, American actress
 Amy Aquino, American television, film, and stage actress
 March 23
 Teresa Ganzel, American comedian and actress
 Amanda Plummer, American actress
 March 24 – Jack Edwards, American play-by-play announcer
 March 26 – Leeza Gibbons, American television personality
 March 28 – Paul Eiding, American actor and voice actor
 March 29 – Christopher Lambert, American actor
 March 30 – Paul Reiser, American comedian and actor
 March 31 – Marc McClure, American actor

April

 April 1 – Denise Nickerson, actress (d. 2019)
 April 8 – Fred Smerlas, American football player and radio host
 April 11 
 April 11
 Michael Card, Christian musician 
 Jim Lauderdale, bluegrass musician 
 April 12
 Vince Gill, singer and songwriter
 Adam Parfrey, journalist and editor (d. 2018) 
 Suzzanne Douglas, African-American actress (d. 2021)
 April 14 – Richard Jeni, comedian (d. 2007)
 April 16 – Essex Hemphill, African American poet and gay activist (d. 1995)
 April 17 – Afrika Bambaataa, DJ and producer
 April 18 – Genie, feral child
 April 21 – Jesse Orosco, baseball player
 April 23 – Jan Hooks, actress and comedian (d. 2014)
 April 27 – Robert Curtis Brown, television, film and stage actor
 April 29 – Timothy Treadwell, environmentalist and filmmaker (d. 2003)

May

 May 2 – Michael Patrick Coyle, composer 
 May 3 – William Clay Ford Jr., automobile executive
 May 4 – Iona Morris, actress
 May 11 – Lynn J. Rothschild, American biologist and astrobiologist
 May 16
 Joan Benoit, Olympic gold medal-winning marathon runner
 Bob Suter, professional ice hockey player (d. 2014
 May 18 – Lionel Shriver, author and journalist
 May 20 – Stewart Nozette, astronomer
 May 21 – Judge Reinhold, actor
 May 24
 John Harrington, American professional ice hockey player
 John G. Rowland, American politician, author, and convicted felon
 May 28 – Kirk Gibson, American baseball player
 May 29
 Bobby Hamilton, stock car racing driver (died 2007)
 Jeb Hensarling, politician
 Ted Levine, actor
 May 31 – Jim Craig, professional ice hockey player

June

 June 5 – Charles Nolan, fashion designer (died 2011)
 June 6 – Jessica Diamond, artist
 June 8 – Scott Adams, cartoonist (Dilbert)
 June 12 – Timothy Busfield, American actor
 June 14
 Suzanne Nora Johnson, lawyer and businesswoman 
 Mona Simpson, novelist
 June 21 – Michael Bowen, American actor
 June 23 – Frances McDormand, American actress
 June 24 – Doug Jones, American baseball player (died 2021)

July

 July 3
 Shan Goshorn, American Cherokee artist (d. 2018)
 Ken Ober, American actor and game show host (d. 2009)
 July 9 – Kelly McGillis, American actress
 July 10 – Cindy Sheehan, American anti-war activist
 July 12
 Rick Husband, American astronaut (d. 2003)
 Buddy Foster, American actor
 July 13 – Cameron Crowe, American writer and film director
 July 16 – Faye Grant, actress
 July 21 – Jon Lovitz, actor and comedian
 July 24 – Jack O'Callahan, professional ice hockey player
 July 26 – Nana Visitor, actress
 July 27 – Matt Osborne, professional wrestler (d. 2013)
 July 31 – Paul Provenza, comedian

August

 August 1 – Taylor Negron, actor (d. 2015) 
 August 2
 Mojo Nixon, singer, lyricist and actor 
 Butch Vig, record producer and drummer (Garbage)
 August 5 – Clayton Rohner, actor
 August 6 – Jim McGreevey, 52nd Governor of New Jersey
 August 9 – Melanie Griffith, American actress
 August 11 – Richie Ramone, American rock drummer
 August 14 – Tony Moran, American actor and producer
 August 16
 Laura Innes, American actress and director 
 Phil Murphy, American politician
 August 18 – Denis Leary, comedian and actor
 August 19 – Martin Donovan, actor
 August 22 – Holly Dunn, country music singer and songwriter (d. 2016)
 August 28
 Rick Rossovich, American actor
 Daniel Stern, American actor
 August 30 – Manu Tuiasosopo, American football player
 August 31 – Gina Schock, American drummer (The Go-Go's)

September

 September 8 – Heather Thomas, actress and activist
 September 11 
 Jeff Sluman, American golfer
 Jeh Johnson, American politician, 4th Secretary of Homeland Security
 September 13 – Vinny Appice, drummer
 September 15 – Brad Bird, American animator and director
 September 18 – Mark Wells, American professional ice hockey player
 September 21 – Ethan Coen, American film director, producer, screenwriter and editor
 September 22
 Mark Johnson, American professional ice hockey player and coach
 Ted Williams, announcer, radio personality, and voice-over artist
 September 24 – Brad Bird, American director, screenwriter, animator, producer and actor
 September 25 – Michael Madsen, American actor
 September 27 – Peter Sellars, theatre director
 September 29 – Andrew Dice Clay, American comedian
 September 30 – Fran Drescher, American actress

October

 October 4 – Bill Fagerbakke, American voice actor
 October 5 – Bernie Mac, African-American comedian and actor (d. 2008)
 October 7 
 Marcus Lamb, American televangelist (d. 2021)
 Michael W. Smith, American Christian musician
 October 14 
 Kenny Neal, guitarist 
 Greg Tate, writer and musician (d. 2021)
 October 15 – Stacy Peralta, American director and skateboarder
 October 16 – Jim Hodges, American installation artist
 October 23 – Martin Luther King III, African-American human rights advocate and community activist
 October 24 – John Kassir, American actor and comedian
 October 25 – Nancy Cartwright, actress 
 October 26 – Bob Golic, American football player
 October 29 – Dan Castellaneta, American actor
 October 30 – Kevin Pollak, American actor
 October 31
 Lauren Berlant, American cultural theorist (d. 2021)
 Brian Stokes Mitchell, American actor and singer
 Shirley Phelps-Roper, American political and religious activist
 Robert Pollard, American musician

November

 November 1 – Peter Ostrum, American child actor and veterinarian
 November 5 – Jon-Erik Hexum, American actor (d. 1984)
 November 6
 Cam Clarke, American actor and singer
 Lori Singer, American actress and musician
 November 7 – Christopher Knight, American actor 
 November 10 – George Lowe, American voice actor and comedian 
 November 13 
 Greg Abbott, American politician
 Roger Ingram, American jazz musician, author, educator, trumpet designer
 November 14
 Gregg Burge, American tap dancer and choreographer (d. 1998)
 Bill Farmer, American actor and comedian
 November 15 – Kevin Eubanks, American jazz guitarist
 November 19 – Tom Virtue, American actor
 November 22 – Don Newman, American basketball player and coach (d. 2018)
 November 23 – William Kaelin Jr., American cellular biologist, recipient of Nobel Prize in Physiology or Medicine in 2019
 November 24 – Denise Crosby, American actress
 November 26 – Kevin Kamenetz, American politician (d. 2018)
 November 27 – Caroline Kennedy, American author and attorney

December

 December 1 – Vesta Williams, American singer-songwriter (d. 2011)
 December 4 – Eric S. Raymond, American open source software advocate
 December 6
 Tom Brinkman, American politician
 Andrew Cuomo, American politician, 56th Governor of New York
 Dana Sue Gray, American serial killer
 December 9 – Donny Osmond, American pop singer
 December 10 – Michael Clarke Duncan, African-American actor (d. 2012)
 December 12 – Sheila E., American percussionist, singer, author, and actress
 December 13 – Steve Buscemi, American actor and comedian
 December 14 – Tim Cone, American head coach working for the Philippine Basketball Association
 December 15 – Laura Molina, American artist, musician and actress
 December 19 – Kevin McHale, American basketball player
 December 20 – Joyce Hyser, American actress
 December 21
 John Geddert, American gymnastic coach (d. 2021)
 Tom Henke, American baseball player
 Ray Romano, American actor and comedian
 December 27 – Greg Mortenson, American humanitarian and author
 December 29 – Bruce Beutler, American immunologist and geneticist
 December 30 – Matt Lauer, American newscaster

Deaths
 January 14 – Humphrey Bogart, film actor (born 1899)
 January 16 – Arturo Toscanini, Italian-born orchestral conductor (born 1867)
 January 26 – Enoch J. Rector, cinema technician, inventor, and film director (born 1863)
 February 2 – Marian Cruger Coffin, landscape architect (born 1876)
 February 10 – Laura Ingalls Wilder, author (born 1867)
 February 16 – William M. Acton, lawyer and politician (born 1876)
 February 25 
 Bugs Moran, gangster (born 1893)
 B. P. Schulberg, film producer (born 1892)
 March 11 – Richard E. Byrd, explorer (born 1888)
 March 29 – Laura Bowman, actress and singer (born 1881) 
 May 2 – Joseph McCarthy, U.S. Senator from 1947 to 1957 (born 1908)
 May 10 – Annie Turnbo Malone, African American millionaire businesswoman, inventor and philanthropist (born 1869)
 May 13 – Robert Alfred Theobald, admiral (born 1884)
 May 16 – Eliot Ness, Prohibition agent (born 1903)
 June 1 – Russell Hicks, actor (born 1895)
 June 4 – Mary Hay, actress and dancer (born 1901)
 June 12 – Jimmy Dorsey, big band leader (born 1904)
 June 13 – Bruno Albert Forsterer, Marine Sergeant, Medal of Honor recipient (born 1869)
 July 3 – Judy Tyler, actress (b. 1932)
 July 8 – Grace Coolidge, First Lady of the United States, Second Lady of the United States (born 1879)
 July 10 – Julia Boynton Green, poet (born 1861)
 July 24 – Frank Fenton, actor (born 1906)
 August 7 – Oliver Hardy, comic film actor (born 1892)
 September 2 – Bobby Myers, race car driver (killed in racetrack accident) (born 1927)
 September 21 
 Margaret Ashmore Sudduth, educator, editor and temperance advocate (born 1859)
 Henry E. Warren, inventor (born 1872)
 October 13 – Erich Auerbach, German philologist, literary critic and comparative scholar (born 1892)
 October 25 – Albert Anastasia, Italian American gangster (born 1902)
 October 29 – Louis B. Mayer, Belarusian-born film studio head (born 1885) 
 November 1 – Charlie Caldwell, sports player and coach (born 1901)
 November 29 – Erich Korngold, Austrian-born composer (born 1897)
 December 10 – Maurice McLoughlin, tennis player (born 1890)
 December 24 – Norma Talmadge, silent film actress (born 1894)

See also
 List of American films of 1957
 Timeline of United States history (1950–1969)

References

External links
 

 
1950s in the United States
United States
United States
Years of the 20th century in the United States